Dorine Nina Chuigoué (born 28 November 1988) is a professional footballer who plays as a centre-back for Spanish Liga F club Real Betis.

Early life
Born and raised in Cameroon into a Cameroonian family, Chuigoué was the only female of five siblings. Living in a mostly male environment, she behaved like a man. During her childhood, she played football, tennis and basketball in her neighborhood. Then, her parents signed her to practice karate. She ultimately opted to pursue a career as a footballer.

Club career
After being left in the Stade Omnisports by her brother and father, Chuigoué started her career with Tonnerre Yaoundé. She played originally as a forward, becoming at the time the best scorer in the Cameroonian league. She had then had an offer to play in Singapore, but had to reject it due to her mother's opposition.

In 2006, Chuigoué moved to Equatoguinean women's league club Águilas Verdes FC. In June 2010, she joined Estrellas de E'Waiso Ipola.

After playing the 2011 FIFA Women's World Cup for the Equatorial Guinea national team, Chuigoué signed for Serbian women's league club Spartak Subotica. She lasted one season there. In mid-2012, she came back to the Equatoguinean league and returned to Estrellas de E'Waiso Ipola, where she played until 2017.

On 3 August 2017, Chuigoué rejoined by Serbian club Spartak Subotica. Next season, she moved to Spanish women's top league club EDF Logroño, playing along with her Equatorial Guinean teammate Jade Boho.

International career
Chuigoué just wanted to play for Cameroon, but was not called up despite her impressive performances at Tonnerre Yaoundé. In 2006, she became a naturalised citizen of Equatorial Guinea. She debuted with the women's national team of that country during the 2006 African Women's Championship. She played in the 2011 World Cup.

References

External links

Profile at Txapeldunak.com 

1988 births
Living people
Footballers from Yaoundé
Cameroonian women's footballers
Cameroonian emigrants to Equatorial Guinea
Naturalized citizens of Equatorial Guinea
Equatoguinean women's footballers
Women's association football fullbacks
Women's association football forwards
Primera División (women) players
EdF Logroño players
Real Betis Féminas players
Equatorial Guinea women's international footballers
2011 FIFA Women's World Cup players
Cameroonian expatriate women's footballers
Cameroonian expatriate sportspeople in Serbia
Expatriate women's footballers in Serbia
Cameroonian expatriate sportspeople in Spain
Expatriate women's footballers in Spain
Equatoguinean people of Cameroonian descent
ŽFK Spartak Subotica players